Asch is a surname. Notable people with the surname include:

Frank Asch (born 1946), American writer
Marc Asch (born 1946), American politician
Moe Asch (1905–1986), founder of Folkways Records, son of Sholem Asch
Peter Asch (born 1948), American water polo player 
Ricardo Asch (born 1947), Argentinian endocrinologist
Roland Asch (born 1950), German race car driver
Sholem Asch (1880–1957), Polish Yiddish writer
Solomon Asch (1907–1996), Polish-American psychologist 
Tim Asch (1932–1994), American photographer and filmmaker

See also
 Asche (surname)
 Ash (surname)
 Ashe (name)